Demolition Man is an Australian reality television series which premiered on A&E on 21 March 2017.

References

External links
 Official Website
 Production Website

A&E (Australian TV channel) original programming
2017 Australian television series debuts
2010s Australian reality television series
Antiques television series
English-language television shows
Television shows filmed in Australia